Dame Hilary Boulding,  (born 25 January 1957) is a British academic administrator and former media professional. Since 2017, she has been the President of Trinity College, University of Oxford. She formerly worked for the BBC and Arts Council England, and served as Principal of the Royal Welsh College of Music and Drama.

Early life and education
Boulding was born on 25 January 1957. She was educated at Heaton School, a state school in Newcastle-upon-Tyne, England. She studied music at St Hilda's College, Oxford, graduating with a Bachelor of Arts (BA) degree.

Career

Media career
Having left university, Boulding joined BBC Scotland: she worked as a television director from 1981 to 1985, and a television producer from 1985 to 1992. She moved to BBC Wales, where she was Head of Arts and Music from 1992 to 1997. Then, from 1997 to 1999, she was Commissioning Editor, Music (Policy) at BBC Radio 3. In 1999, Boulding left the BBC to join the Arts Council of England as Director of Music. The organisation was renamed Arts Council England in 2002, when the regional arts boards were merged into it.

Academic career
In July 2007, Boulding was appointed the Principal of the Royal Welsh College of Music & Drama (RWCMD) in succession to Edmond Fivet. During her time in charge, she oversaw £22.5 million of development including the building of a 450-seat concert hall and a 160-seat theatre.

In September 2016, it was announced that Boulding had been elected as the next President of Trinity College, Oxford, in succession to Sir Ivor Roberts. This made her the first woman in its 462-year history to head the college. She took up the appointment on 1 August 2017.

Personal life
In 2015, Boulding married John Summers, the chief executive of the Halle Orchestra.

Honours
In the 2017 Queen's Birthday Honours, Boulding was appointed a Dame Commander of the Order of the British Empire (DBE) "for services to education and culture in Wales", and thereby granted the title dame.

References

 

 
 
 
 
 
 

Living people
1957 births
Alumni of St Hilda's College, Oxford
Dames Commander of the Order of the British Empire
Presidents of Trinity College, Oxford
British television directors
British women television directors
British television producers
British women television producers
People associated with the Royal Welsh College of Music & Drama